Gol Mir may refer to:
 Gol Mir, Hirmand
 Golmir, Hirmand County
 Gol Mir, Zabol